Teng Yi is a male former international table tennis player from China.

Table tennis career
From 1985 to 1989 he won several medals in singles, doubles, and team events in the Asian Table Tennis Championships and five medals in the World Table Tennis Championships. He also won the gold medal in the Table Tennis World Cup of 1987 in Macao.

The five World Championship medals included a gold medal in the team event for China.

He also won two English Open titles.

See also
 List of table tennis players
 List of World Table Tennis Championships medalists

References

Chinese male table tennis players
Living people
Asian Games medalists in table tennis
Table tennis players at the 1986 Asian Games
Table tennis players from Beijing
Medalists at the 1986 Asian Games
Asian Games gold medalists for China
Asian Games silver medalists for China
Year of birth missing (living people)